Coat-Méal is a commune in the Finistère department of Brittany in northwestern France.

Population
Inhabitants of Coat-Méal are called in French Coat-Méaliens.

See also
Communes of the Finistère department

References

External links

Official website 

Mayors of Finistère Association  

Communes of Finistère